The Swiss Wheelchair Curling Championship is the national championship of wheelchair curling teams in Switzerland. It has been held annually since the 2003–2004 season. The championships are organized by the Swiss Curling Association.

List of champions

References

External links
Resultate Archiv Breitensport - swisscurling (click on "Kategorie", choose "Rollstuhlcurling")
Swiss Curling Association Champions (web archive; look at page 166, "Rollstuhl Curling / Curling en chaise roulante"; 2004-2011 champion teams)

See also
Swiss Men's Curling Championship
Swiss Women's Curling Championship
Swiss Mixed Curling Championship
Swiss Mixed Doubles Curling Championship
Swiss Junior Curling Championships
Swiss Senior Curling Championships

 
Curling competitions in Switzerland
National curling championships
Recurring sporting events established in 2004
2004 establishments in Switzerland
Annual sporting events in Switzerland